Galearia is a genus of plant of the family Pandaceae. It is native to Indochina, insular Southeast Asia, New Guinea and the Solomon Islands. They are large trees or shrubs which exude a white liquid.

Accepted species:

Galearia aristifera Miq. - Borneo, Malaysia, Sumatra
Galearia celebica Koord. - Sulawesi, New Guinea, Bismarck Archipelago, Solomon Islands
Galearia filiformis (Blume) Boerl. - Java, Sumatra
Galearia fulva (Tul.) Miq. - Indochina, Borneo, Malaysia, Sumatra, Philippines
Galearia maingayi Hook.f. - Thailand, Borneo, Malaysia, Sumatra

References

Pandaceae
Malpighiales genera
Taxa named by Alexander Moritzi
Taxa named by Heinrich Zollinger